George Lucas (born 1944) is an American film director, screenwriter, producer, editor, and entrepreneur. His most well known work includes both the Star Wars and Indiana Jones franchises. In addition to producing feature films, he has also created television series and written books.

Full-length films

Short films and attractions

Television films and series 

Young Indiana Jones story writing credits

Other media

Books

Author

Adaptations unproduced episodes of Star Wars: The Clone Wars series

Multimedia products for PC 
George Lucas developed and produced variety multimedia content for CD-ROM:

 GTV: A Geographic Perspective on American History (1990)
 Life Story: The Race for the Double Helix (1990)
 The Mystery of the Disappearing Ducks (1993)

Unreleased and unrealized projects

Acting credits

Full-length films

Short films

Television

Uncredited production roles 
Lucas has worked as an otherwise executive producer or creative capacity on several films and television series where he was not credited.

List incomplete.

Full-length films

Short films and attractions 
Also many documentary features about Lucasfilm films from DVD and Blu-ray.

Television films and series 

Also many documentary videos and documentary web-series about Lucasfilm films from television Internet, DVD and Blu-ray.

Other contribution
In addition to any of his own involvement, Lucas has numerous "Based on characters created by", "Based on Star Wars created by", "Based on Indiana Jones created by", "Very Special Thanks" and "Special Thanks" credits in various films, television series and video games.

Full-length films

Short films

Television series

Video game

Comic book

Re-releases

References

External links

 
 
 
 
 George Lucas biography at Lucasfilm.com

 
Lucas, George
Filmography